Fauscoum, also known as Kilclooney Mountain, is a mountain in County Waterford, Ireland.  It is the highest mountain of the Comeragh Mountain Range and the second highest mountain in County Waterford after Knockmealdown.

See also
Lists of mountains in Ireland
List of mountains of the British Isles by height
List of P600 mountains in the British Isles
List of Marilyns in the British Isles
List of Hewitt mountains in England, Wales and Ireland

References 
 
 "Fauscoum". Mountainviews.ie.

Mountains and hills of County Waterford
Mountains under 1000 metres
Marilyns of Ireland